Jason M. Fletcher is an American economist, Professor of Public Affairs and Sociology in the Robert M. La Follette School of Public Affairs, and Director of the Center for Demography of Health and Aging at the University of Wisconsin–Madison. His research is in the fields of health economics and the economics of education, as well as the incorporation of social genomics into economic research. He received his B.S. degree from the University of Tennessee–Knoxville in 2000 and his M.S. and Ph.D. from the University of Wisconsin–Madison in 2003 and 2006, respectively. From 2010 to 2012, he was a Robert Wood Johnson Foundation Health & Society Scholar at Columbia University. In 2012, he became a research fellow at the IZA Institute of Labor Economics and received the Young Scholars Award from the William T. Grant Foundation.

References

External links

Year of birth missing (living people)
Living people
American economists
University of Wisconsin–Madison faculty
University of Wisconsin–Madison alumni
University of Tennessee alumni